Willard City School District is a public school district serving students in the city of Willard, Ohio, United States. The school district enrolls 1,777 students as of the 2012–2013 academic year. The district has a new facility which houses all K-12 students all at the same location.

Schools

Elementary schools
Willard Elementary School (Pre-K-2nd)
Central Elementary School (closed)
Greenfield Elementary School (closed)
New Haven Elementary School (closed)
Richmond Elementary School (closed)

Middle schools
Willard Intermediate School (3rd-6th)

High schools
Willard Middle/High School (7th-12th)

References

External links
 

Education in Huron County, Ohio
School districts in Ohio